Kozma is a Hungarian surname. Notable people with the surname include:

 Dominik Kozma (born 1991), Hungarian swimmer
 István Kozma (footballer) (born 1964), Hungarian footballer
 Július Kozma (1929-2009), Slovak chess player
 Mihály Kozma (born 1949), Hungarian footballer
 Miklós Kozma (1884−1941), Hungarian politician
 Robert Kozma, American mathematician
 Pete Kozma (b. 1988), American baseball player
 András Kozma (b. 1952), Hungarian musician and philosopher
 Alonso Pizarro Kozma (b. 1991), Chilean architect and philosopher.

See also 
 Yadegar, Razavi Khorasan, also known as Kozma, village in Razavi Khorasan Province, Iran
 Kosma

Hungarian-language surnames